Choi Jin (Hangul: 최진, Hanja: 崔眞, born 6 January 1983), more commonly known by the stage name Mithra Jin (Hangul: 미쓰라 진), is a South Korean hip hop recording artist, and lyricist. He is the second MC of the group Epik High.

Biography 
On 3 August 2010, Mithra Jin enlisted for mandatory military service. He entered the 102 reserve in Chuncheon, then served as an infantry rifle soldier, a member of the military band and a GOP soldier, including a stint at the Defense Media Agency (DEMA). He was discharged by the Ministry of Defense in Yongsan-gu, Seoul on 14 May 2012.

On 22 December 2014, it was revealed he was dating actress Kwon Da-hyun. On 10 August 2015, it was announced that Mithra Jin and Kwon Da-hyun would marry in early October. The couple held a small private ceremony on 2 October 2015. Their son Eden (이든) was born 9 June 2021.

Career 
Mithra Jin was originally a poet who focused on rhyme. He eventually made a debut in the group K-Ryders, which included J-Win, DJ D-Tones, and Kyung Bin. K-Ryders were active in the Korean hip-hop underground at the start of the 2000s but disbanded in 2002. He was emceeing in public parks and performing poetry readings when he met Tablo, who would go on to lead their group Epik High.

In 2012, it was revealed DJ Tukutz and Mithra Jin were no longer signed to Woollim Entertainment.

Around June/July 2012, several hints were given to the possibility of an Epik High comeback in the second half on the year: the group was mentioned in the YG Entertainment Stock Report, in a tweet from a fashion designer stating costumes for Epik High's comeback were being prepared under YG, and in a tweet from Jerry K to Tablo that said he is anticipating the upcoming Epik High album. On 25 July 2012, YG officially announced that Epik High would make their comeback under the label with the album 99, after a three-year hiatus as a group.

In 2018, Mithra Jin, along with Tablo and DJ Tukutz, left YG Entertainment to work independently.

References

External links 

  
 Mithra Jin's Cyworld homepage 

Epik High
1983 births
Living people
South Korean male rappers
South Korean hip hop record producers
YG Entertainment artists